The 100 metres at the World Championships in Athletics has been contested by both men and women since the inaugural edition in 1983. It is the second most prestigious 100 m title after the 100 metres at the Olympics. The competition format typically has two or three qualifying rounds leading to a final between eight athletes. Since 2011 a preliminary round has been held, where athletes who have not achieved the qualifying standard time compete to enter the first round proper.

The championship records for the event are 9.58 seconds for men, set by Usain Bolt in 2009, and 10.67 seconds for women, set by Shelly-Ann Fraser-Pryce in 2022. The men's world record has been broken or equalled at the competition three times: by Carl Lewis in 1987 and 1991, and by Usain Bolt in 2009. Ben Johnson beat Lewis in the 1987 final, but his win and record were subsequently rescinded after his admission to long-term steroid use. Lewis's mark, which equalled the standing record at the time, was never officially ratified by the IAAF as a world record. The women's world record has not yet been beaten at the championships.

Shelly-Ann Fraser-Pryce is the most successful athlete of the event as the only person, male or female to win five titles. Carl Lewis, Maurice Greene and Usain Bolt are the most successful male athletes of the event, having each won three titles. Justin Gatlin ties Fraser-Pryce the most medals with 5, 2 gold and 3 silver. 
Merlene Ottey and Carmelita Jeter are the only other athletes to have claimed four medals in the history of the World Championships event.

The United States is the most successful nation in the discipline, having won fifteen gold medals. Jamaica are a clear second with six gold medals. East Germany, with two, is the only other nation to have won multiple titles.

Age
All information from IAAF

Doping
Canada's Ben Johnson and Angella Taylor-Issajenko were both disqualified from the 1987 World Championships in Athletics for doping. Johnson was stripped of his 100 m gold, elevating Carl Lewis to world champion, while  Taylor-Issajenko finished fifth in the women's 100 m final.

At the following edition in 1991, Irina Slyusar of the Soviet Union (a women's semi-finalist) was disqualified for doping. Eight years passed without incident in the 100 m before the double Nigerian doping disqualification of Innocent Asonze and Davidson Ezinwa in 1999.

Tim Montgomery became the 100 m second medalist to be disqualified, losing his silver medal from the 2001 World Championships in Athletics. From the same event, Marion Jones later lost her silver medal for doping infractions, becoming the first female medalist to be stripped of a 100 m medal. Venolyn Clarke and Kelli White (a women's finalist) were also disqualified that year. The results of Dwain Chambers and Montgomery, fourth and fifth in 2003, were removed for doping. Two women's medalists were stripped of their honours for doping Kelli White lost the world title while Zhanna Block had her bronze medal removed. Block's times from the 2005 edition were also annulled. These disqualifications were a result of the BALCO scandal, which included many 100 m runners.

No doping offences were recorded at the 2007 World Championships 100 metres, but bans shortly returned, with Ruqaya Al-Ghasra being banned from the 2009 edition and a female trio of Inna Eftimova, Semoy Hackett and Norjannah Hafiszah Jamaludin being disqualified in 2011. The 2013 World Championships saw one elimination in Masoud Azizi.

Among the men's world champions, only Donovan Bailey and Usain Bolt have not been implicated in doping during their careers; three-time champion Maurice Greene never failed a drug test, but admitted purchasing drugs on other athletes behalf.

Medalists

Men

Multiple medalists

Medalists by country

Women

Multiple medalists

Medalists by country

Championship record progression

Men

  Ben Johnson's winning time of 9.83 broke the championship record and was a new world record, but it was retrospectively annulled due to doping.

Women

Finishing times

Top ten fastest World Championship times

H – time recorded in the heats
QF – time recorded in the quarter-finals
SF – time recorded in the semi-finals

Best time for place

References
11.R S D Unnithan's kerala India's nobel prize work 2002–16;2016–20;2021-22-92:8092 ad Personal profiled DATAS at Guinness world records from online nobel org/www.mednobel.ki.se/www.olympics.org

Bibliography

External links
Official IAAF website

 
World Championships in Athletics
Events at the World Athletics Championships